Merulicium is a genus of fungi, tentatively placed in the Pterulaceae family. The genus is monotypic, containing the single species Merulicium fusisporum.

References

External links

Pterulaceae
Monotypic Agaricales genera